Stewart Adams may refer to:
 Stewart Adams (ice hockey) (1904–1978), Canadian ice hockey player
 Stewart Adams (chemist) (1923–2019), English pharmacist

See also
 Stuart Adams (born ), American politician